CBM Christian Medical Centre (founded in 1904) is a participating hospital of the Council of Christian Hospitals.  It is located in Pithapuram, Kakinada district, Andhra Pradesh, India.

About

The Reverend Dr. William Gordon Carder, who once taught church history at Andhra Christian Theological College, Hyderabad, wrote that it was Dr. E. G. Smith, first medical missionary of Canadian Baptist Mission to arrive in India, who was credited with founding the hospital in Pithapuram. Gordon wrote,

Gordon further wrote that when Dr. Smith went on furlough in 1910, Dr. Jessie Allyn who came in his place once went to Palace of Raja of Pithapuram to attend to the Rani, who delivered a child.  In honour, Rani of Pithapuram bestowed grants to build an exclusive hospital for women and children near the existing hospital.

CBM Christian Medical Centre is a member of:

 Council of Christian Hospitals, Pithapuram
 Christian Medical Association of India, New Delhi

The hospital also networks with the Christian Medical College, Vellore.

References

Further reading
 
 
  II
 
 
 

Medical Council of India
Hospitals in Andhra Pradesh
Christian hospitals
Buildings and structures in Kakinada district
Canadian Baptist Ministries
Hospitals established in 1904
1904 establishments in India